Bradfield Hall is an academic building located on the central campus of Cornell University in Ithaca, New York. It is located on Tower Road at the eastern edge of the Agricultural Quadrangle.

Description
Designed in the brutalist style by Ulrich Franzen, the building was completed in 1969. Bradfield currently houses Cornell's departments of Crop and Soil Science, Earth and Atmospheric Sciences, Plant Breeding and Genetics. As most of the laboratories in the building are climate controlled, none of the rooms in the first ten stories in Bradfield have windows (the hallways have windows at each end). 

The eleventh floor contains the Northeast Regional Climate Center, one of the six National Oceanic and Atmospheric Administration regional climate centers. Also located in the building are a computer lab and a library. Bradfield Hall was named after Professor Richard Bradfield, a noted crop and soil scientist and Guggenheim Fellowship winner.

Among its accolades, Bradfield Hall has been named one of the "World's 10 most spectacular university buildings" by the building data site Emporis.

Bradfield is reported to be one of the most "energy-intensive" buildings on campus.

References

External links
 Cornell Meteorology page on Bradfield Hall
 Architectural Forum feature

1969 establishments in New York (state)
University and college buildings completed in 1969
Cornell University buildings
Brutalist architecture in New York (state)